Rocca d'Evandro is a Comune (Municipality) in the Province of Caserta in the Italian region Campania, located about  northwest of Naples and about  northwest of Caserta.

History
Ancient Roman archaeological findings have been excavated in the area, such as the wine trading port at Porto di Mola. The castle, around which the village is built, appeared around the 10th century and was later bitterly contended by the local rulers. In the 14th century it was acquired by the Abbey of Monte Cassino, while, in the early 16th century, it was a fief of Ettore Fieramosca. In 1534 it was conquered by the Kingdom of Naples; the Spanish king and emperor Charles V donated it to the poet Vittoria Colonna.

References

External links
 Official website
 Rocca d'Evandro in the world

Cities and towns in Campania